Rhosydd is a village in the community of Bodedern, Ynys Môn, Wales, which is 136.6 miles (219.8 km) from Cardiff and 221.7 miles (356.8 km) from London.

References

See also 
 List of localities in Wales by population

Villages in Anglesey